Necessary Evil: Super-Villains of DC Comics is a 2013 feature-length documentary about DC Comics super villains.

Synopsis
Necessary Evil: Super-Villains of DC Comics explores the roles that DC villains have had in shaping the stories that they appear in.

Development
The film was first announced on March 26, 2013, with production on the film beginning on March 30 and Christopher Lee narrating the film. The film premiered at the 2013 San Diego Comic Con. Lee recorded a message about the film that was presented at Comic-Con. He was chosen to narrate the film because of his experience of playing villains. Geoff Johns, Kevin Shinick, Andrea Romano, JM Kinney, and Scott Devine promoted the film at a panel at Comic-Con.

The film was released on DVD and Blu-ray Disc on October 25, 2013. Interviewees appearing in the film include Guillermo del Toro, Zack Snyder and Richard Donner.

Cast
 Christopher Lee – narrator (voice only)
 Clancy Brown
 Claudia Black
 Kevin Conroy
 Guillermo del Toro
 Richard Donner
 Geoff Johns
 Dr. Travis Langley
 Jim Lee
 Dr. Andrea Letamendi
 Andrea Romano
 Scott Snyder
 Zack Snyder
 Michael Uslan
 Len Wein
 CM Punk
 Marv Wolfman
 Paul Dini
 Bobbie Chase
 Bob Harras
 Scott Porter
 Peter Tomasi
 Dan Didio
 Brian Azzarello
 Marc Guggenheim
 Phil Morris
 Andrew Kreisberg
 Doug Mahnke
 Richard Donner
 Neal Adams
 James Robinson
 Paul Levitz
 Kevin Shinick
 Glen Murakami
 Tony Daniel
 Ames Kirshen
 Alan Burnett
 Brian Buccellato
 Mike Carlin
 Michael Shannon
 Ed Boon
 Geoff Boucher

References

External links
Movies.yahoo.com
Dccomics.com

2013 direct-to-video films
2013 documentary films
2013 films
Films based on DC Comics
Documentary films about comics
Direct-to-video documentary films